Khowrabad (also Romanized as Khowrābād, Khor Ābād, and Khūrābād) is a village in Kahak Rural District, Kahak District, Qom County, Qom Province, Iran. At the 2006 census, its population was 1,633, in 429 families.

References 

Populated places in Qom Province